Hong Kong Island is an island in the southern part of Hong Kong. The island had a population of about 3,000 inhabitants scattered in a dozen fishing villages when it was occupied by the United Kingdom in the First Opium War (1839–1842). In 1842, the island was formally ceded in perpetuity to the UK under the Treaty of Nanking and the City of Victoria was then established on the island by the British Force in honour of Queen Victoria. 
The Central area on the island is the historical, political and economic centre of Hong Kong. The northern coast of the island forms the southern shore of the Victoria Harbour, which is largely responsible for the development of Hong Kong due to its deep waters favoured by large trade ships.

The island is home to many famous sights, such as "The Peak", Ocean Park, many historical sites and various large shopping centres. The mountain ranges across the island are also famous for hiking.
The northern part of Hong Kong Island, together with Kowloon and Tsuen Wan New Town, forms the core urban area of Hong Kong.

The island is often referred to locally as "Hong Kong side" or "Island side". The suffix "side" applied to other locations (e.g. China-side and Kowloon Walled City-side), the sole remnant of which is "Kowloon side" when indicating the two sides of the harbour.

Suburbs and localities
Hong Kong Island comprises the following suburbs/localities of Hong Kong:

Aberdeen
Admiralty
Ap Lei Chau
Big Wave Bay
Braemar Hill
Causeway Bay
Central/Chung Wan
Chai Wan
Chung Hom Kok
Cyberport
Deep Water Bay
East Mid-Levels
Fortress Hill
Happy Valley
Jardine's Lookout
Kennedy Town
Lung Fu Shan
Mid-Levels
Mount Davis
North Point
Pok Fu Lam
Quarry Bay
Repulse Bay
Sai Wan Ho
Sai Wan
Sai Ying Pun
Sandy Bay
Shau Kei Wan
Shek O
Shek Tong Tsui
Sheung Wan
Siu Sai Wan
So Kon Po
Stanley
Tai Hang
Tai Tam
Tin Hau
Victoria Park
Victoria Peak
Wan Chai
West Mid-Levels
Wong Chuk Hang

Administration

Hong Kong Island is not part of the Islands District. Four districts of Hong Kong are located on the island:
 Central and Western District
 Eastern District
 Southern District (including the islands of Ap Lei Chau and Ap Lei Pai)
 Wan Chai District

Hong Kong Island is one of the five Legislative Council geographical constituencies.

History
Human settlement of the area dates back millennia, as evidenced by Neolithic artifacts discovered in Stanley, Hong Kong Island. Qin Shi Huang's imperial government settled Baiyue, and later Hong Kong Island was under the jurisdiction of Panyu County in Nanhai County, to the Western Jin Dynasty. After the sixth year of the Eastern Jin Dynasty (AD 331), it belonged to Baoan County. According to the book: "monuments and heritage Hong Kong Island East Region "(Chinese name: < 港島東區風物志》 ），  the Hong Kong Yacht Club (formerly known as Lantern Island, also known as Kellett Island) (the entrance to the Hong Kong Island at the Cross-Harbour Tunnel today) has unearthed the copper coins from the Sui and Tang Dynasties to the Song Dynasty. It is estimated that at during the Sui and Tang Dynasties, the island already had commercial activity. In the first year of the Wanli Period of the Ming Dynasty (1573), it was the territory of Xin'an County, and remained so until it was ceded to the United Kingdom.

British colony 

Following the First Opium War (1839–1842), Hong Kong Island was ceded to Britain in 1842 under the Treaty of Nanking and the territory became a Crown colony. At the time, the island was populated by only a few thousand people, and was thus described as being almost uninhabited.

Japanese invasion and occupation 
The Second World War was a dark period for Hong Kong. In the 1930s, the British anticipated a Japanese attack on Hong Kong. As Wong Nai Chung Gap was a strategically-important place of defence, large-scale defensive works were constructed there, including anti-aircraft batteries, howitzers and machine gun nests.

The Battle of Hong Kong began on 8 December 1941. British, Canadian and Indian armies and the Hong Kong Volunteer Defence Forces resisted the Japanese invasion commanded by Sakai Takashi, which began eight hours after the attack on Pearl Harbor. However, the Japanese took control of the Hong Kong skies on the first day of attack and outnumbered the defenders, who retreated from the Gin Drinkers Line and consequently from Kowloon under heavy aerial bombardment and artillery barrage.

On 18 December, the Japanese had conquered North Point, reaching Wong Nai Chung Gap on the next day. English and Scottish forces and the Canadian Winnipeg Grenadiers vigorously defended the crucial point of Wong Nai Chung Gap, and for a while successfully secured the passage between Central and the secluded southern parts of the island. Japanese casualties were about 600. However, Allied forces there were ultimately defeated by the Japanese on 23 December, and Wong Nai Chung Reservoir was lost – the only one in Hong Kong at the time. As Wan Chai Gap had also fallen that same day, the British had no choice but to surrender.

Hong Kong was surrendered on 25 December 1941, thereafter often called "Black Christmas" by locals. The Governor of Hong Kong, Mark Young, surrendered in person at the temporary Japanese headquarters, on the third floor of the Peninsula Hotel, thus beginning the Japanese occupation of Hong Kong. Isogai Rensuke became the first Japanese governor of Hong Kong. Hyper-inflation and food rationing followed; and the Japanese declared Hong Kong Dollars illegal. The Japanese enforced a repatriation policy throughout the period of occupation because of the scarcity of food and the possible counter-attack of the Allies. As a result, the unemployed were deported to the Mainland, and the population of Hong Kong had dwindled from 1.6 million in 1941 to 600,000 in 1945.

Geography

Hong Kong Island is the second-largest island of the territory, the largest being Lantau Island. It makes up approximately 7% of the total territory. It is separated from the mainland (Kowloon Peninsula and New Territories) by Victoria Harbour.

Most of the hills across the middle of the island are included within the country parks.

Demographics
The population  is 1,270,876, which makes up approximately 19% of that of Hong Kong. Its population density is higher than for the whole of Hong Kong, c. 18,000 per km2. However, the population is heavily concentrated along the northern shore.

The residents living in the Central and Western and Wanchai districts of Hong Kong island have the highest median household income of any area in Hong Kong. Affluent districts on Hong Kong Island are The Peak, Western Mid-Levels (Conduit Road/Robinson Road/Magazine Gap Road/Kotewall Road etc.), Eastern Mid-Levels (Happy Valley/Tai Hang/Jardine's Lookout), Tai Tam, Deep Water Bay and Repulse Bay.

88.5% of Hong Kong Island's residents are of Chinese descent. The largest ethnic minority groups are Filipinos (4%), Indonesians (2.4%), and White people (2.4%).

80.2% of Hong Kong Island's residents use Cantonese as their usual language, while 8% use English and 1.9% use Mandarin.

Transport

Seven of the MTR rapid transit system's eleven lines service Hong Kong Island. The Island line and South Island line run exclusively on Hong Kong Island, with the Island line serving the north shore at 17 stations, and the South Island line connecting four stations on Ap Lei Chau and in Wong Chuk Hang to the north shore at Admiralty station. Five MTR lines – the Tsuen Wan line, the Tseung Kwan O line, the Tung Chung line, the Airport Express – connect the north shore with Kowloon and provide onward service to the New Territories, and the East Rail line which provides another cross-harbour connection upon its extension from Hung Hom station to Admiralty station. In future, the planned North Island line infrastructure project would extend both the Tung Chung line and the Tseung Kwan O line to connect them to each other, forming a route parallel to the middle section of the Island line.

Two other rail systems, Hong Kong Tramways and the Peak Tram, also run exclusively on Hong Kong Island. The former runs mostly parallel to the Island line between Kennedy Town and Shau Kei Wan, with a loop linking Causeway Bay and Happy Valley; the latter is a funicular linking Central District to Victoria Peak.

Hong Kong Island is connected to the Kowloon Peninsula on the mainland by two road-only tunnels (the Cross-Harbour Tunnel and the Western Harbour Crossing), three MTR railway tunnels (East Rail line, Tsuen Wan line and Tung Chung line/Airport Express) and one combined road and MTR rail link tunnel (Eastern Harbour Crossing, containing the Tseung Kwan O line and road traffic in separate parallel conduits). There are no bridges between the island and Kowloon, although two bridges – the Ap Lei Chau Bridge, a road bridge, and Aberdeen Channel Bridge, part of the South Island line – connect the Hong Kong island to Ap Lei Chau.

See also

 Connaught Road
 Conservation in Hong Kong
 Des Voeux Road
 List of islands and peninsulas of Hong Kong
 List of places in Hong Kong
 List of streets and roads in Hong Kong
 Queen's Road

References

External links

Map of Hong Kong in 1844

 
Islands of Hong Kong
Populated places in Hong Kong